Lilli Jahn (born Schlüchterer; 5 March 1900 – ca. 19 June 1944) was a German-Jewish medical doctor and victim of Nazism in Germany. She gained international fame posthumously following the publication of her letters to her five children which she wrote during her imprisonment in the labour camp Breitenau. She was deported to the concentration camp Auschwitz and was murdered there.

Life

Childhood and Education 
Lilli Jahn was born as Lilli Schlüchterer, daughter of a wealthy tradesman who lived in Cologne as a liberal assimilated Jew. She got a quite progressive education for a girl at that time: She was taking her A-levels in 1919 at Kaiserin-Augusta-School in Cologne and started after that studying medicine in Würzburg, Halle (Saale), Freiburg im Breisgau and Cologne. Her sister Elsa who was a year younger than she was studied chemistry. 1924 Lilli finished her studies successfully and got her conferral of a doctorate with a thesis about Hematology. Firstly she worked on a temporary employment at a doctor's practice and the "Israelitischens Asyl für Kranke und Altersschwache" in Cologne.

Imprisonment in Breitenau 
At the end of August 1943 Lilli Jahn was denounced. She had omitted to add the name ‘Sara’ – obligatory for all female Jews – on her doorbell, but left the doctor’s degree, which was forbidden for Jews. She was arrested, interrogated and due to violation of the Reichsgesetz of 17 August 1938, was sent to the labor education camp Breitenau near Guxhagen, south of Kassel, under dubious circumstances.
Her underage children were left to themselves more or less. Initially, Lilli Jahn worked as a forced labourer in a pharmaceutical factory. Her daughter Ilse managed to visit her already weakened mother during her arrest only once. Until today it has remained unclear to what extent Ernst Jahn tried to save the life of his ex-wife by pleas to the responsible Gestapo in Kassel or the Reich’s security main department in Berlin.
Rescue efforts by friends of the Avowed Church in Kassel remained unsuccessful.

Deportation to Auschwitz and death 
In March 1944, Lilli Jahn was deported in a collective transport via Dresden to Auschwitz.
Prior to her deportation she managed to smuggle her children's letters out of Breitenau: they ended up at her son's, who kept them without the knowledge of his sisters until his death in 1998. The last preserved letter by Lilli Jahn from Auschwitz dated 6 March 1944, was written by someone else. Her children got the message of her mother's death in September 1944 in Immenhausen.

Bibliography 
Doerry, Martin; John Brownjohn (Translator): My Wounded Heart: The Life of Lilli Jahn, 1900-1944 (2004).Bloomsbury USA.

References

German people who died in Auschwitz concentration camp
1900 births
1944 deaths
Physicians from Cologne
Jewish physicians
German civilians killed in World War II
German Jews who died in the Holocaust
20th-century German physicians
Jewish women
German women physicians